Saša Imprić (born January 9, 1986 in Zagreb) is a medley swimmer and  from Croatia, who made his Olympic debut for his native country at the 2004 Summer Olympics in Athens, Greece. There he was eliminated in the qualifying heats of the 400 m Individual Medley, placing 32nd.

Sources 
 

1986 births
Living people
Male medley swimmers
Olympic swimmers of Croatia
Swimmers at the 2004 Summer Olympics
Swimmers at the 2008 Summer Olympics
Swimmers from Zagreb
Croatian male swimmers
21st-century Croatian people